Under Nevada Skies  is a 1946 American Western film directed by Frank McDonald and starring Roy Rogers.

Cast
 Roy Rogers as himself
 Trigger as Roy's Horse
 George 'Gabby' Hayes as Gabby Whittaker
 Dale Evans as Helen Williams
 Douglas Dumbrille as Courtney
 Leyland Hodgson as Tom Craig
 Tris Coffin as Dan Adams
 Rudolph Anders as Alberti
 LeRoy Mason as Henchman Marty
 George Lynn as Henchman Hoffman
 Bob Nolan as Bob
 Sons of the Pioneers as Musical Group

External links
 

1946 films
Republic Pictures films
1946 Western (genre) films
American Western (genre) films
American black-and-white films
Films directed by Frank McDonald
1940s English-language films
1940s American films